Kyzyl-Jar is a village in Kara-Kulja District of Osh Region of Kyrgyzstan. Its population was 732 in 2021. 

It is located to the east of the Alai Mountains and towards the west of the Tian Shan mountain range. Nearby towns and villages include Kayyn-Talaa (2 km southeast), Terek (5 km north) and Kök-Art (15 km southeast).

References

External links
Satellite map at Maplandia.com

Populated places in Osh Region